Antti Ticklén (born 19 July 1958) is a Finnish cross-country skier. He competed in the 50 km event at the 1988 Winter Olympics.

Cross-country skiing results

Olympic Games

World Cup

Season standings

References

External links
 

1958 births
Living people
Finnish male cross-country skiers
Olympic cross-country skiers of Finland
Cross-country skiers at the 1988 Winter Olympics
People from Siikajoki
Sportspeople from North Ostrobothnia
20th-century Finnish people